The Mindelo Ornithological Reserve (ROM - "Reserva Ornitológica de Mindelo" in Portuguese) is located in the coastal zone of the North of Portugal, municipality of Vila do Conde, 20 km from Oporto, occupying an area of around 6 million square meters. 

In ROM we can find a mosaic of two small coastal lagoons with water coming from Silvares and Varziela streams, extensive dune areas, forest and agriculture fields. It is an important place for migratory birds, with 153 species already identified. It is also a significant refuge for amphibians (13 species) and reptiles.

It was legally created in 1957 in order to protect resident and migratory birds, forest and dunes, being the first area for nature conservation in Portugal. It is also said to be the first Ornithological Reserve in Europe.
Santos Junior, professor in the Faculty of Sciences of the University of Oporto, proposed the creation of the reserve and initiated the bird banding in Portugal with the help from roleiros. Roleiros are turtle dove catchers using nets with traditional methods unique in the world. To be a roleiro was considered a highly regarded social status until the late 1960s. From 1953 to 1989, about 20,000 doves were captured for bird ringing. The practice of bird banding stopped in 1989.

Therefore a traditional activity of significant ethnographical value (dove hunting) was converted in a scientific activity, being the ROM created with the full support of all the landowners. 

In the last decades many areas of the Reserve have been built for houses and industry, sand dune vegetation was removed, waste was dumped, fires took place and it suffered from coastal erosion. But the natural value of the place still remains. In the recent Coastal Zone Management Plan it was considered almost the only place with significant natural value in the region and "an important sanctuary for wildlife; to be protected at any cost".

ROM's ecological characteristics and integration in Oporto urban area, makes it a privileged place for protection of endangered birds at the European level and also for environmental education and tourism.

External reference
Reserva Ornitológica de Mindelo (in Portuguese)

Nature conservation in Portugal